Alpout (also, Alpoud) is a village and the least populous municipality in the Qazakh District of Azerbaijan.  It has a population of 990.

References 

Populated places in Qazax District